John Glover (November 5, 1732January 30, 1797) was an American fisherman, merchant, politician, and military leader from Marblehead, Massachusetts, who served as a brigadier general in the Continental Army during the American Revolutionary War. He is most famous in American history for his regiment rowing Washington across the Delaware, the Battle of Long Island, and leading the first integrated regiment in the American military.

Early life
Glover was born in Salem, Massachusetts, the son of a house carpenter. When John was four years old, his father died. Shortly thereafter, his mother and three brothers moved to the neighboring town of Marblehead. As a young man, Glover became a cordwainer and rum trade and eventually a ship owner and international merchant. He married Hannah Gale in October 1754. 

Following the Boston Massacre in 1770, Committees of Correspondence were formed. Marblehead elected Glover along with future revolutionists Elbridge Gerry and Azor Orne to committee posts. After the First Continental Congress passed the non-importation agreements sanctioning trade with the British, Glover was elected to enforce the embargo as a member of the committee of inspection.

In 1773, there was a deadly smallpox outbreak in the town of Marblehead. John Glover along with Azor Orne and Elbridge Gerry petitioned the town of Marblehead for a hospital to be built on Cat Island. After the town voted against it out of suspicions, they took it upon themselves to privately build the hospital on the island after receiving permission from Salem. Known as the Essex Hospital, it was successful in treating majority of the patients. However, many of Marblehead's citizens were still uneasy about it, forcing it to close, with a few locals eventually burning it down.

Military career
 
Glover was active in the militia for many years before the Revolution, with his earliest service dating back to 1759. In 1775 he was elected lieutenant colonel of the 21st Massachusetts Regiment from Marblehead, and became commander of the unit after the death of Colonel Jeremiah Lee in April 1775.

American Navy 
Glover marched his regiment to join the siege of Boston in June 1775. At Boston, General George Washington chartered Glover's schooner Hannah to raid British supply vessels, the first of many privateers or warship authorized by Washington. For this reason the Hannah has been occasionally called the first vessel of the Continental Navy or its later successor the United States Navy.

Leader of the first integrated American Regiment 
The Marblehead militia or "Glover's Regiment" became the 14th Continental Regiment. John Glover was able to raise a regiment of 500 men composed of both his militia and Marblehead mariners, and termed by Washington as soldiers “bred to the sea.” This regiment became known as the "amphibious regiment" for their vital nautical skills. It was composed almost entirely of seamen, mariners and fishermen. Many of these men of were Native Americans, Jewish, African-Americans, and Spanish forming the first integrated units in the new American military.

Battle of Long Island 
After Washington lost the Battle of Long Island (aka Battle of Brooklyn) in August 1776, Glover's Marbleheaders evacuated the army across the East River to Manhattan Island in a surprise nighttime operation, saving them from being entrapped in their fortified trenches on Brooklyn Heights. In subsequent actions of the New York campaign the regiment fought well against the British at Kip's Bay when the Redcoats invaded, landing on Manhattan and Pell's Point.

Battle of Trenton 
The last action of the regiment was its most famous: ferrying Washington's army on confiscated river coal ore boats from upstream across the Delaware River at night for a surprise attack on Hessian forces at the Battle of Trenton in New Jersey on the morning of December 26, 1776.

Saratoga Campaign 
After Trenton, Glover went home to tend to his sick wife and look to business affairs. He turned down a promotion to brigadier general in February 1777, but rejoined the war and accepted the promotion after a personal appeal from General Washington.  As commander of a brigade made up of four Massachusetts regiments, he served in the successful Saratoga campaign with General Schuyler along the Hudson River in the summer and fall of 1777. He would later join the attack on the British encampment with General Gates, leading to the surrender and capture of 5,791 of soldiers of the British Army under the command of General John Burgoyne. General Glover was assigned to escort the prisoners back to Cambridge, MA, where his regiment was greeted all the way back with victorious cheers by spectators along the road.

West Point & Battle of Rhode Island 
In the winter of 1778, his brigade joined Washington's encampment at Valley Forge. In June of that year, Washington assigned him the command of Fort Arnold, at West Point, where he surpervised the construction of the forts and redoubts in the area.  In the following years he would take part in Battle of Rhode Island, where he was able to muster two entire companies in Boston and Salem, with the majority of the volunteers from Marblehead to help reinforce the effort to take back Rhode Island. For the remainder of  the war, he was stationed back along the Hudson River at West Point, guarding against British moves up the river from New York City.

Retirement from Military Service 
After Cornwallis surrender at Yorktown in October 1781, it would take two years for a peace treaty to be signed, so the army was not yet disbanded. During this time, General Glover was ordered to Massachusetts to take charge and muster recruits. In July 1782, General John Glover retired from the army, due to his failing health and was placed on the half-pay established by a resolution of Congress.

Later life

Hannah, Glover's first wife, died in 1778. He married again, in 1781, to widow Frances (Hitchborn) Fosdick. John Glover moved to the Glover Farm in 1782, on the current day border of Marblehead and Swampscott. He had purchased  it the year before in 1781 from the state, who had confiscated the property from a British loyalist. In 1784, the Marquis de Lafayette would come to visit his friend Glover who fought with him in the American Revolution where they "had shared the hardships and victories of the battlefield as well as the friendship of Gen. George Washington."

Political Career 
John Glover served in local offices including six terms as a town selectman, delegate to the state convention that ratified the U.S. Constitution (1788), and two-term member of the Massachusetts House of Representatives (1788-1789).  During his 1789 tour of the United States, President George Washington made a special detour to see his old reliable army friend John Glover and thank the town of Marblehead for their service during the war.

Death 
John Glover died on January 30, 1797, after contracting hepatitis. He was buried in a brick tomb at Old Burial Hill (Marblehead, Massachusetts).  His death is now commemorated annually by Glover's Regiment, with a memorial lantern procession to his tomb and a three-volley gun salute.

Historic Residences 
John Glover and his family lived in Marblehead, MA where he built a house in 1762, now known as the John Glover House, a National Historic Landmark. The Glover farmhouse, in Swampscott, MA, and also built in 1700s, is where Glover lived beginning in 1782 after retiring from the military. While living here, he served as a local selectman and Massachusetts State representative. The house still stands today in Swampscott, MA but threatened by demolition.

Memorials & Legacy

 On November 20, 1783, he was awarded the charter for the town of Glover, Vermont, as its prime proprietor, in honor of his service.
 Fort Glover in Marblehead, originally built for the Revolutionary War as the Huit's Head Battery, was named for him when rebuilt in the Civil War.
 The frigate  was named for him, and sponsored by Mrs. William S. Pederson, Sr., and Mrs. Claude V. Signer, his great-great-great-granddaughters.
 Glover's Rock in the Bronx is a memorial to him.
 Glover School in Marblehead was named after him in 1916.
 There is a statue of Glover on Commonwealth Avenue in Boston.
 The General John Glover House is located in Marblehead.
 General Glover Farm in Swampscott
 Glover's Rock in Pelham, New York, is named for him.
Commemorated at St. Paul's Church National Historic Site, NY

Glover's Regiment 

In honor of General Glover's Legacy, founded for the bicentennial, and continue to this day, a dedicated group of re-enactors take part in special events throughout the year commemorating the achievements of Glover and his regiment.

Books 
History and Traditions of Marblehead by Samuel Roads
General John Glover and His Marblehead Mariners by George Bilias (1960)
The Indispensables by Patrick K. O'Donnell (2021)
Saving Washington's Army: The Brilliant Last Stand of General John Glover at the Battle of Pell's Point, New York, October 18, 1776, by Phillip Thomas Tucker (2022)
A Memoir of General John Glover, of Marblehead by William P. Upham

Popular culture
In the 2000 television movie The Crossing, the part of Glover is a pivotal character, and played by Sebastian Roché.

Notes

References

Fowler, William M. "Glover, John". American National Biography Online, February 2000.
General John Glover and His Marblehead Mariners by George Bilias. 1903
 Glover's Regiment. 1908

1732 births
1797 deaths
Colonial American merchants
People of colonial Massachusetts
Continental Army generals
Continental Army officers from Massachusetts
Glover, Vermont
Infectious disease deaths in Massachusetts
People from Marblehead, Massachusetts
American privateers
Continental Navy
Deaths from hepatitis